The 2017 European U23 Wrestling Championships was the 3rd edition of European U23 Wrestling Championships of combined events, and took place from March 28 to 2 April in Szombathely, Hungary.

Medal table

Team ranking

Medal summary

Men's freestyle

Men's Greco-Roman

Women's freestyle

References

External links 

2017 in European sport
European Wrestling U23 Championships
Sports competitions in Hungary